The Palm Beach International Film Festival is a film festival in the United States held in Palm Beach, Florida which showcases over 120 films annually in April for over 20,000 attendees. It was recently ranked by the international movie publication MovieMaker Magazine as one of the top 10 destination film festivals in the world as well as one of the Top 25 Independent Festivals in the world. The festival has also hosted more than 150 World Premieres and thousands films from over 60 countries.

The Palm Beach International Film Festival (PBIFF) is a not for profit 501 (c) 3 organization.

History

Palm Beach International Film Festival was founded in 1996 by Commissioner Burt Aaronson and local philanthropists George Elmore, Keith Waters, Charlotte Pelton and Michael Ostroff. They envisioned the festival as offering an exciting cultural venue for the community and as a fundraising opportunity for educational film and television programs throughout Palm Beach County schools.

Executive Director: Kevin Mills

Awards

The festival became a competitive forum in 2003.  The festival jury presents awards in such categories as:
Best Picture
Best Documentary
Best Director
Best Actor/Actress 
Best Short Film
Audience Favorite

References

Film festivals in Florida
Palm Beach, Florida
Tourist attractions in Palm Beach County, Florida